Cabinet Stoltenberg may refer to:
First cabinet Stoltenberg
Second cabinet Stoltenberg